The Cuban is a 2019 Canadian drama film, directed by Sergio Navarretta and written by Alessandra Piccione. The film stars Ana Golja as Mina, a young woman working at a nursing home managed by her aunt Bano (Shohreh Aghdashloo) while preparing for medical school, whose outlook on life is profoundly changed when she meets and befriends Luis Garcia (Louis Gossett Jr.), a former Cuban jazz musician who has been living in the home since being diagnosed with dementia.

Plot 
An unexpected friendship begins between an elderly Cuban musician with dementia who is brought out of his shell by his care worker, and a disillusioned young pre-med Afghan student named Mina. Through a shared loved of music, both their lives are changed.

Cast

In addition, Gabriel Sanchez Hernandez is seen throughout the film when Luis' addled memories conjure up the young Elena.

Release

The film premiered on December 7, 2019 at the Whistler Film Festival, where Celiana Cárdenas won the Borsos Competition award for Best Cinematography in a Canadian Film. It had its American premiere in February 2020 at the Los Angeles Pan African Film Festival, winning the Audience Award for Narrative Feature and the Special Programmer's Award.

In April 2020, the film aired on Super Channel as part of its special program of airing the films that had been slated to run at the Canadian Film Festival prior to its cancellation in light of the COVID-19 pandemic.

The film was released at drive-ins and traditional theatres across Canada on July 28, 2020 and in virtual cinemas across the United States on July 31, 2020.

Awards and nominations

References

External links

The Cuban at Library and Archives Canada

2019 films
Canadian drama films
English-language Canadian films
Films directed by Sergio Navarretta
Black Canadian films
2010s English-language films
2010s Canadian films